Class Rank is a 2017 American romantic comedy film directed by Eric Stoltz and written by Benjamin August. The film stars Skyler Gisondo, Olivia Holt, Kristin Chenoweth, Kathleen Chalfant, Nick Krause, and Peter Maloney.

The film had its world premiere at the Newport Beach Film Festival on April 21, 2017. It had a limited release and went to video on demand on May 11, 2018, by Cinedigm.

Plot
Two high school outsiders join forces in an attempt to overtake the local school board. Guided by their families, they enter the perilous world of politics and in the process, learn a thing or two about love.

Cast
 Skyler Gisondo as Bernard Flannigan, an incredibly smart, although young, candidate for the Livingston School Board.
 Olivia Holt as Veronica Krauss, Bernard's friend and love interest who is ranked second in their class.
 Kristin Chenoweth as Janet Krauss, Veronica's mother who works behind the scenes at Law & Order: Special Victims Unit.
 Bruce Dern as Oswald Flannigan, Bernard's retired grandfather.
 Kathleen Chalfant as Barbara, the editor-in-chief of the local newspaper.
 Nick Krause as the Bagger, a friend of Bernard's who works at the local supermarket.
 Peter Maloney as Mr. Del Tufo, a member of the school board.
 Rod McLachlan as Principal Greely
 Daryl J. Johnson as Postal Worker Wesley
 Danni Wang as Tai Yu
 Ian Patrick as the Brilliant Young Nerd
 Eric Stoltz as the Brilliant Young Nerd's Father (Cameo appearance; Stoltz directed the film.)

Production
On November 20, 2015, it was announced that Eric Stoltz would direct the comedy film Class Rank, based on the script by Benjamin August. Producer would be SSS Entertainment's Shaun Sanghani and Single Cell Pictures' Sandy Stern.

Principal photography on the film began on November 30, 2015, in Alexandria, Louisiana.

Release
The film had its world premiere at the Newport Beach Film Festival on April 21, 2017. Shortly after, Cinedigm acquired distribution rights to the film, and set it for a May 11, 2018, release.

Reception
On review aggregator website Rotten Tomatoes, the film holds an approval rating of 86%, based on 14 reviews, and an average rating of 6.32/10.

References

External links
 

2010s high school films
2017 romantic comedy films
2010s teen comedy films
2010s teen romance films
2017 films
American high school films
American romantic comedy films
American teen comedy films
American teen romance films
Films shot in Louisiana
2010s English-language films
2010s American films
2017 directorial debut films
Films directed by Eric Stoltz